Joel Bissonnette is a Canadian-American actor.

Early life and education 
Born in Baltimore, Maryland, Bissonnette was raised in Montreal, Quebec. He is a graduate of the Dawson College Theatre Program in Montreal.

Career 
Bissonnette is best known as Arnaud DeFöhn from the SciFi channel's show Invisible Man and was a lead in Canadian series Liberty Street.

He has appeared in the films Looking for Leonard, Century Hotel, Boulevard, Suspicious River, The Sum of All Fears, Fight Club, Darkman III, Language of the Heart, Fall, The Curious Case of Benjamin Button and Death of a Ladies' Man. In 2010, Bissonnette played the assassin Pavel Tokarev in the eighth season of the television series 24. In 2018, played Brian in the film Desert Shores for which he won the Best Actor Marcello Mastroianni Award at the Blow-Up Chicago International Arthouse Film Festival.

Personal life 
Bissonnette's brother is film director Matt Bissonnette.

Filmography

Film

Television

References

External links

American male film actors
American male television actors
Canadian people of American descent
Canadian male film actors
Canadian male television actors
Male actors from Montreal
Male actors from Maryland
Year of birth missing (living people)
Living people
Dawson College alumni